A light gun is a pointing device for computers and a control device for arcade and video games, typically shaped to resemble a pistol.

Early history

The first light guns were produced in the 1930s, following the development of light-sensing vacuum tubes. In 1936, the technology was introduced in arcade shooting games, beginning with the Seeburg Ray-O-Lite.

These games evolved throughout subsequent decades, culminating in Sega's Periscope, released in 1966 as the company's first successful game, which requires the player to target cardboard ships. Periscope is an early electro-mechanical game, and the first arcade game to cost one quarter per play. Sega's 1969 game Missile features electronic sound and a moving film strip to represent the targets on a projection screen, and its 1972 game Killer Shark features a mounted light gun with targets whose movement and reactions are displayed using back image projection onto a screen. Nintendo released the Beam Gun in 1970 and the Laser Clay Shooting System in 1973, followed in 1974 by the arcade game Wild Gunman, which uses film projection to display the target on the screen. In 1975, Sega released the early co-operative light gun shooters Balloon Gun and Bullet Mark.

Sequential targets
The first detection method, used by the NES Zapper, involves drawing each target sequentially in white light after the screen blacks out. The computer knows that if the diode detects light as it is drawing a square (or after the screen refreshes), then that is the target at which the gun is pointed. Essentially, the diode tells the computer whether or not the player hit something, and for n objects, the sequence of the drawing of the targets tell the computer which target the player hit after 1 + ceil(log2(n)) refreshes (one refresh to determine if any target at all was hit and ceil(log2(n)) to do a binary search for the object that was hit).

A side effect of this is that in some games, a player can point the gun at a light bulb or other bright light source, pull the trigger, and cause the system to falsely detect a hit on the first target every time. Some games account for this either by detecting if all targets appear to match or by displaying a black screen and verifying that no targets match.

Infrared emitters
The Wii Remote uses an infrared video camera in the handheld controller, rather than a simple sensor. Wesley Yin-Poole stated that the Wii Remote was not as accurate as a traditional light gun.

GunCon 3 is an infrared gun.

Rectangular positioning
Rectangular positioning is similar to image capture, except it disregards any on-screen details and only determines the rectangular outline of the game screen. By determining the size and distortion of the rectangle outline of the screen, it is possible to calculate where exactly the light gun is pointing. This method was introduced by the Sinden Lightgun.

Positional gun

The positional gun is common in video arcades, as a non-optical alternative to a light gun. The positional gun is permanently mounted on a swivel on the cabinet, as an analog joystick for aiming crosshairs onscreen. This is typically more expensive initially but easier to maintain and repair. Positional gun games include Silent Scope, the arcade version of Resident Evil Survivor 2, Space Gun, Revolution X, and Terminator 2: Judgment Day. Console conversions may use light guns.

A positional gun is essentially an analog joystick that records the position of the gun to determine the player's aim on the screen. The gun must be calibrated, which usually happens after powering up. Early examples of a positional gun include Sega's Sea Devil in 1972, Taito's Attack in 1976, and Cross Fire in 1977, and Nintendo's Battle Shark in 1978.

Models

Oscilloscope Light Gun – Braun  – 1947
Beam Gun – Nintendo – 1970
Shooting Gallery – Magnavox Odyssey – 1972
Laser Clay Shooting System – Nintendo – 1973
Qwak! – Atari – 1974
Wonder Wizard – General Home Products – 1976
ColorSport VIII – Granada – 1976
GD-1380 – Heathkit – 1976
TV-Sports 801 – Lloyds – 1976
Sportsman, Tournament 150, 200, 2000, 2501 – Unisonic – 1976/1976/1977/1977
Telstar Ranger, Telstar Arcade, Telstar Marksman – Coleco – 1977/1977/1978
TV Fun Sportsrama – APF Electronics – 1977
TV Master 6 – Binatone – 1977?
Visio Matic 101 – CIT Alcatel – 1977
Model 1199 – Interstate – 1977
Markint 6 – Markint – 1977
N20 – Philips – 1977
Visiomat 11 – Pizon-Bross – 1977
TV Scoreboard – RadioShack – 1977
Home T.V. Game – Santron – 1977
TV game – Sennheiser – 1977
105 – Sportron – 1977
501 – Starex – 1977
Mark V-C – Unimex – 1977
XK 600B – Ingersoll – 1978
Jeu TV TVG-6 – Klevox – 1978
OC 5000 Occitane – Société Occitane d'Electronique – 1978
Videosport – Prinztronic – 1978
Color TV game – Sands 1978
Telescore – Groupe SEB – 1978
Sports Centre, Colour TV game 3600 MK III – Granada plc – 1979
Color Multi-Spiel – Universum – 1979
NES Zapper – Nintendo – 1984
Wild Gunman – Nintendo – 1984 
Light Phaser – Sega – 1986
Magnum Light Phaser - ZX Spectrum - 1987
XG-1 – Atari (XEGS) – 1987
Action Max – Worlds of Wonder – 1987
"Plus-X" Terminator Laser - ASCII - 1989
LaserScope – Konami – 1990
Super Scope – Nintendo – 1992
Menacer – Sega – 1994
Gamegun - 3DO Interactive Multiplayer 
Peacekeeper Revolver – Philips CD-i – 1994
GunCon – Namco – 1997
Stunner - Sega Saturn − 1995
Dreamcast Light Guns – Sega – 2000–2003
GunCon 2 – Namco – 2001
Topgun – EMS – 2005
Topgun II – EMS – 2007
GunCon 3 – Namco – 2008
Integrated Pistol – MoProUsa – 2008
PSVR AIM Controller – Sony Computer Entertainment - 2017

See also
Light gun shooter
List of light gun games

References

 
American inventions